The women's 12.5 km competition of the Sochi 2014 Paralympics was held at Laura Biathlon & Ski Complex near Krasnaya Polyana, Sochi. The competition took place on 14 March.

Medal table

Visually impaired 
In biathlon, visually impaired, the athlete with a visual impairment has a sighted guide. The two skiers are considered a team, and dual medals are awarded.

Sitting

Standing

References

Biathlon at the 2014 Winter Paralympics
Biath